"Dancing in the Dark" is a song written and performed by American rock singer Bruce Springsteen. Adding uptempo synthesizer riffs to his sound for the first time, the song spent four weeks at number two on the Billboard Hot 100 and sold over one million singles in the U.S. It was the first single released from his 1984 album, Born in the U.S.A., and became his biggest hit, helping the album become the best-selling album of his career.

"Dancing in the Dark" was also successful worldwide, becoming Australia's highest-selling single of 1984 (despite peaking at number five on the Kent Music Report), peaking at number one in Belgium and the Netherlands, and charting within the top 10 in seven other countries. The song is listed among the Rock and Roll Hall of Fame's 500 Songs that Shaped Rock and Roll.

Writing and recording
Springsteen wrote "Dancing In the Dark" overnight, after Jon Landau convinced him that the album needed a single. According to journalist Dave Marsh in the book Glory Days, Springsteen was not impressed with Landau's approach. "Look", he snarled, "I've written seventy songs. You want another one, you write it." Despite this reaction, Springsteen sat in his hotel room and wrote the song in a single night. It sums up his state of mind, his feeling of isolation after the success of his album The River, and his frustrations of trying to write a hit single. Six takes of "Dancing in the Dark" were recorded on February 14, 1984, at The Hit Factory, and after 58 mixes, work was completed on March 8, 1984. The 12-inch single was released May 9, 1984, and was the highest-selling 12-inch single in the US that year.

Reception
Cash Box said that the song "is classic Springsteen: gutsy vocals set to a hard-driving backbeat" and "an added surprise is the addition of the synthesizer to the inspired playing of the E-Street Band."

Chart performance
Released as a single prior to the album's release, the song entered the Billboard Hot 100 chart on May 26, 1984, at no. 36, and spent four weeks at No. 2 (his highest-charting song to date) beginning June 30, 1984 (it was kept off the No. 1 spot by Duran Duran's "The Reflex" and that year's song of the summer, Prince's "When Doves Cry"). It did, however, reach No. 1 on the Cash Box Top 100 Singles chart. It was also the first of a record-tying seven top 10 hit singles to be released from Born in the U.S.A. "Dancing in the Dark" also held the No. 1 spot for six weeks on Billboard's Top Tracks chart. The song reached No. 1 on the Radio & Records CHR and AOR airplay charts.

In the UK, the song peaked at No.4. It was the 29th-best-selling single of the year.

The recording also won Springsteen his first Grammy Award, picking up the prize for Best Rock Vocal Performance in 1985. In the 1984 Rolling Stone readers poll, "Dancing in the Dark" was voted "Single of the Year". The track has since gone on to earn further recognition and is as such listed one of The Rock and Roll Hall of Fame's 500 Songs that Shaped Rock and Roll.

Remixes
In a first-for-Springsteen effort to gain dance and club play for his music, Arthur Baker created the 12-inch "Blaster Mix" of "Dancing in the Dark", wherein he reworked the album version. The remix was released on July 2, 1984. The result generated a lot of media buzz for Springsteen, as well as actual club play; the remix went to #7 on the Billboard Hot Dance Music/Club Play chart, and had the most sales of any 12-inch single in the United States in 1984.

Music video
Directed by Brian De Palma, the video was shot at the Saint Paul Civic Center in Saint Paul, Minnesota, on June 28 and 29, 1984. The first night was a pure video shoot, the second was on the opening date of the Born in the U.S.A. Tour. Bruce Springsteen and the E Street Band performed the song twice during that show to allow De Palma to get all the footage he needed. The video is a straight performance video, with Springsteen not playing a guitar, allowing him to invite a young woman from the audience, performed by Courteney Cox, to dance along with him on the stage at the end. Although De Palma had told him that it was she whom he was supposed to select, Springsteen thought she was just a pre-selected fan attending and did not know until afterward that she was a professional actress, brought in from New York City, who had already played in As the World Turns. Despite this Cox has stated that she was one of many that Springsteen could have selected and that she was secretly hoping to not be picked. 

The video initially included a storyline in which Cox and several of her friends were getting ready to go to the concert with one of them getting picked. Vignettes were shot for this although they remained unused. In September 1985, the video won the MTV Video Music Award for Best Stage Performance and was nominated for Best Overall Performance. Actor Alfonso Ribeiro later claimed to have drawn inspiration from Cox's dancing in the video in developing "The Carlton" for his character in The Fresh Prince of Bel-Air.

Live performance history
On the 2009 Working on a Dream Tour, the song appeared intermittently during the encores. However, Springsteen for the first time played a number of music festivals during the routing, and "Dancing in the Dark" closed all of them: Pinkpop Festival, Bonnaroo Music Festival, Glastonbury Festival, and Hard Rock Calling. When played live in recent years, the song features a harder, guitar-driven sound, with the distinctive synthesizer riff being supplied by Soozie Tyrell's violin.

During the 2012 tour the song again became a regular at live shows with audience members selected to dance not just with Springsteen (reenacting the Courteney Cox scene from the video), but with other band members too, especially new band member Jake Clemons. Springsteen family members appeared on stage for this song on occasion, with mother Adele doing the "Courteney Cox" dance at the Wells Fargo Center in Philadelphia at the start of the tour, and daughter Jessica dancing on stage with him in Paris on July 5.

Personnel
According to authors Philippe Margotin and Jean-Michel Guesdon:

Bruce Springsteen – vocals, guitars
Roy Bittan – keyboards
Clarence Clemons – saxophone
Garry Tallent – bass
Max Weinberg – drums

Track listings

7": Columbia / 38-04463
"Dancing in the Dark" – 3:59
"Pink Cadillac" – 3:33

7": CBS / WA-4463 *
"Dancing in the Dark" – 3:59
"Pink Cadillac" – 3:33
(*Car-shaped picture disc released in the UK, featuring a pink Cadillac on the front side)

12": Columbia / 44-05028
"Dancing in the Dark" (Blaster Mix) – 6:09
"Dancing in the Dark" (Radio) – 4:50
"Dancing in the Dark" (Dub) – 5:30

12": CBS / TA4436
"Dancing in the Dark" (Extended Remix) – 6:09
"Pink Cadillac" – 3:33

 The B-side of the single, "Pink Cadillac", was a comic rockabilly tale about the virtues (and vices) of a colourful Cadillac; in 1988 it became a #5 hit for Natalie Cole.

Charts

Weekly charts

Year-end charts

Certifications

See also
List of number-one hits of 1985 (Flanders)
List of Dutch Top 40 number-one singles of 1985
List of Billboard Mainstream Rock number-one songs of 1984
List of Cash Box Top 100 number-one singles of 1984

Footnotes

References
 Born in the U.S.A. Tour (tour booklet, 1984), Springsteen chronology.
 Born in the U.S.A. The World Tour (tour booklet, 1985), Tour chronology.
 Marsh, Dave. Glory Days: Bruce Springsteen in the 1980s. Pantheon Books, 1987. .

1984 singles
Bruce Springsteen songs
Dance-rock songs
Cashbox number-one singles
Number-one singles in Belgium
Dutch Top 40 number-one singles
Songs written by Bruce Springsteen
Song recordings produced by Jon Landau
Columbia Records singles
Grammy Award for Best Male Rock Vocal Performance
1984 songs
Songs about dancing
Song recordings produced by Bruce Springsteen
Song recordings produced by Steven Van Zandt
Song recordings produced by Chuck Plotkin